The 1908–09 Dartmouth men's ice hockey season was the 4th season of play for the program.

Season
After sagging to the bottom of the college hockey ranks in 1908 Dartmouth responded by hiring its first head coach. Though John Eames would only last one year behind the bench, the team responded well and finished with a team-record 11 wins. The Green would not reach double-digit wins again until 1923.

Note: Dartmouth College did not possess a moniker for its athletic teams until the 1920s, however, the university had adopted 'Dartmouth Green' as its school color in 1866.

Roster

Standings

Schedule and Results

|-
!colspan=12 style=";" | Regular Season

References

Dartmouth Big Green men's ice hockey seasons
Dartmouth
Dartmouth
Dartmouth
Dartmouth